Micriantha decorata is a species of moth of the family Noctuidae. It is found in Turkey.

External links
Species info
Checklist of Turkish Lepidoptera

Heliothinae
Endemic fauna of Turkey
Moths described in 1845
Insects of Turkey